Neil Passmore Craig (born 11 January 1956) is a former Australian rules footballer who played for the Norwood Football Club, Sturt Football Club and the North Adelaide Football Club in the South Australian National Football League (SANFL).

He later worked as a fitness adviser, and then became coach of the Adelaide Football Club, a caretaker coach of the Melbourne Football Club, the former General of Performance at the Essendon Football Club, as well as the Director of Coaching at the Carlton Football Club.

Since 2017 he has been high performance manager for the England rugby union team, working with head coach Eddie Jones.

Playing career
Craig played a total of 319 games (and kicked 220 goals) in the South Australian National Football League (SANFL) as well as 11 State of Origin matches for South Australia.

He played 126 games for the Norwood Football Club, debuting as a 17-year-old in 1973. He was a part of their premiership sides in 1975 and 1978, before leaving the club after the 1979 season.

Craig played 134 games for Sturt (captaining the side in 1985 and 1986) between 1980 and 1986 and was also captain of South Australia in 1984.

He moved to North Adelaide, where he finished his career, playing 61 games between 1987 and 1990.  At one stage of his career, Craig was pursued by Footscray, a Victorian team in the Victorian Football League (VFL), but declined the offer as he preferred to stay in South Australia.  At that time there was a great rivalry between the VFL and SANFL and both competitions considered themselves the best in Australia.

Post-playing career
In 1991, Craig became the coach of Norwood, a position he held until 1995. In 2002, he was inducted into the South Australian Football Hall of Fame.

Fitness advising
Craig hails from a fitness background and holds a sports science degree.

He has worked with the Australian cycling team at the Olympic Games and with the South Australian Institute of Sport, as a senior sports scientist. He has worked under cycling legend Charlie Walsh at the Australian Cycling Federation (where he was Sports science co-ordinator) and also recruited Walsh as part of the Crows' AFL coaching panel.

Adelaide
In 1997, Craig took up the position of fitness adviser with the Adelaide Crows.  He is credited with helping devise the fitness regime that led the Crows to back-to-back premierships in 1997 and 1998 in which players were trained harder mid-season in order to reach peak fitness during finals matches.

Craig left the club in 1999 to help the Australian Olympic cycling team prepare for the 2000 Sydney Olympic Games but returned in 2001 to be an assistant coach under Gary Ayres. In late 2001 Craig was the favourite for the West Coast Eagles coaching job in 2002 but dropped out of the running. He took over the senior coaching position at the Crows in 2004 as caretaker when Ayres left the club after Round 13.  He was then appointed full-time for the 2005 season and immediately led the Crows to their first minor premiership in 2005, and took the team to two successive preliminary finals in his first two years as senior coach in 2005 and 2006, losing and being eliminated by West Coast Eagles twice. Under Craig, the Crows reached the finals for five consecutive years but achieved limited success, leaving Craig with a finals' coaching record of three wins and six losses. The club under Craig had a disappointing 2010 season, when Adelaide under Craig finished eleventh with nine wins and thirteen losses, therefore missing out of the finals. After another disappointing 2011 season, when Adelaide under Craig sat fourteenth on the ladder with four wins and twelve losses, Craig resigned as senior coach of the Adelaide Crows on 25 July 2011 after a 103-point loss to St Kilda in Round 18, 2011. He left the club as the longest serving coach in the Crows' history. Craig was then replaced by assistant coach Mark Bickley as caretaker senior coach for the rest of the 2011 season.

Melbourne
After his resignation as Adelaide Football Club senior coach, Craig was signed as the Director of Sports Performance at the Melbourne Football Club on 29 September 2011, beginning in the 2012 season. His primary role was mentoring and assisting the players of the club, in particular the younger players, and to mentor and assist the other assistant coaches, including an assistant coach.

Despite the off-season acquisitions of several experienced players, such as Shannon Byrnes, Tom Gillies, Chris Dawes and David Rodan, the Demons underachieved in the first half of 2013 AFL season, managing just 1 win in their first 11 games. As the result of this poor start to the 2013 season, after the Demons' mid-season bye on 17 June 2013, the Demons' senior coach, Mark Neeld, was sacked. His sacking came within weeks of the departures of senior Demons' staff members Cameron Schwab and Don McLardy. Subsequently, Craig was appointed as the caretaker senior coach of the Demons for the remainder of the 2013 season. Craig coached the Demons for 11 games, managing just 1 win, for a winning percentage of just 9%. Craig left the club after the completion of the 2013 season with former Sydney Swans premiership senior coach Paul Roos taking over the senior coaching role at the end of the season.

Essendon
On 10 October 2013, Craig was appointed to the newly created role of head of coaching development and strategy at the Essendon Football Club and then on 15 April 2014, he was promoted to the position of General Manager, Performance. In this role Craig oversaw all team performance functions including coaching, development and high performance which meant that the coaching staff reported to him.

Carlton
On 30 September 2015, Craig was appointed to Brendon Bolton's new coaching panel at Carlton, taking on the role of Director of Coaching, Development and Performance. On 14 August 2017, it was announced that he would retire from his career in the football industry at the end of the 2017 season.

England Rugby Union
From October 2017, Craig worked as "a consultant for highest performance to look how we operate and see how we can improve" with the England rugby union senior team. Areas of focus included leadership, communication and teamwork. Part of his role was also to be a 'critical friend' to head coach Eddie Jones whom he had worked with previously. The team reached the final of the 2019 World Cup.

Gold Coast Suns
In December 2019, Craig joined the Gold Coast Suns in a part-time consultancy role for the coaching group. This involved a game day bench role in the 2021 season.

Head coaching record

Explanatory notes

References

External links

Australian rules footballers from South Australia
Adelaide Football Club coaches
Sturt Football Club players
North Adelaide Football Club players
Norwood Football Club players
Norwood Football Club coaches
Living people
Australian physiologists
Australian sports scientists
1956 births
South Australian Sports Institute alumni
Melbourne Football Club coaches
South Australian Football Hall of Fame inductees
South Australian State of Origin players
South Australian Sports Institute coaches